The Inflanty Voivodeship, or Livonian Voivodeship, also known as Polish Livonia, was an administrative division and local government in the Polish–Lithuanian Commonwealth, since it was formed in the 1620s out of the Wenden Voivodeship and lasted until the First Partition of Poland in 1772. The Inflanty Voivodeship was one of the few territories of the Polish–Lithuanian Commonwealth to be ruled jointly by Poland and Lithuania.

Overview
The Inflanty Voivodeship, also called the Duchy of Inflanty, due to a 1667 bill of the Sejm, was the minority remainder of the Duchy of Livonia, which had been conquered by the Swedish Empire during the Polish–Swedish War of 1621–1625. The seat of the voivode was Dyneburg (Daugavpils).

The name Inflanty is derived through Polonization of Livland, the German name for Livonia. In modern times the region is known as Latgalia in the Republic of Latvia.

Zygmunt Gloger in his monumental book Historical Geography of the Lands of Old Poland provides this description of Inflanty Voivodeship:

Voivodes

This is a list of the voivodes for Inflanty:

 Jerzy Farensbach
 Maciej Demblński
 Krzysztof Słuszka
 Teodor Doenhoff
 Joachim Tarnowski
 Tomasz Sapieha
 Paweł Sapieha
 Mikołaj Korft
 Przecław Leszczyński
 Alexander Morszlyn
 Jan Teodor
 Jerzy Płatem
 Otto Fryderyk Felkierzamb
 Jan Koss
 Jędrzej Głębocki
 Piotr Przebendowski
 Antozi Morsztyn
 Wilhelm Płatem
 Jan Borch
 Stanisław Brzostowski
 Jozafat (Jan) Zyberg
 Gaspar Rogaliński
 Adam Falkierzamb

References

Voivodeships of the Polish–Lithuanian Commonwealth
Organisations based in Livonia
1621 establishments in the Polish–Lithuanian Commonwealth
1772 disestablishments in the Polish–Lithuanian Commonwealth